Transmit Failure is the second album by band Four Hundred Years. It was recorded at Inner Ear by J. Robbins of Jawbox in April 1998.

Track listing 
"Power of Speech" – 1:30
"Penny for Your Thoughts" – 1:56
"Radio Silence" – 2:24
"Transmit Failure" – 2:43
"An Hour Too Late" – 2:59
"Motion Sickness" – 2:13  
"Throw Spark" – 2:41
"Sequence" – 2:08
"Give Us This Day" – 2:22
"Line Breaker" – 4:41
"(Untitled)" – 5:05

Four Hundred Years albums
1999 albums